Yatra also marketed as YSR: Yatra is a 2019 Indian Telugu-language biographical film starring Mammootty in the role as Y. S. Rajasekhara Reddy. Directed by Mahi V Raghav, the film is based on padayatra of Reddy who served as Chief Minister of Andhra Pradesh from May 2004 to June 2009 representing Indian National Congress. The film is produced by Vijay Chilla, Shashi Devi Reddy under 70mm Entertainments and music composed by K. Principal photography commenced on 20 June 2018 in Hyderabad.

The film was released on 8 February 2019 alongside dubbed versions in Malayalam and Tamil. Despite receiving critical acclaim, the film did not perform commercially.

Plot

Cast

Mammootty as Y. S. Rajasekhara Reddy
Suhasini Maniratnam as Sabitha Indra Reddy
Jagapathi Babu as Y. S. Raja Reddy 
Ashrita Vemuganti as Y. S. Vijayamma
Rao Ramesh as K. V. P. Ramachandra Rao 
Anasuya Bharadwaj as Gowru Charitha Reddy
Sachin Khedekar as Ghulam Nabi Azad
Posani Krishna Murali as Y Venkatarao
Prudhvi Raj as Sujaya Krishna Ranga Rao
Vijayachander as Mandipalli Narayana Reddy
Thalaivasal Vijay as Tulla Devender Goud
Jeeva 
Thotapalli Madhu as V. Hanumantha Rao
Tarun Dhanrajgir as N.D. Tiwari 
Vinod Kumar as K. Chennakesava Reddy
Nagineedu as Telapalli Raghavayya
Nassar as Teacher Venkatappa
Surya as Doctor
Dil Ramesh as Veerappa
Mahesh Achanta as Obulesh
Sanjay Swaroop as D.C.P.
Ravi Kale as Henchman
 Chatrapathi Sekhar as Farmer
Kalyani as Worker

Soundtrack
The music is composed by K, while the lyrics are written by Sirivennela Sitaramasastri. The first single "Samara Shankham" was released on 2 September 2018 on the anniversary of Y. S. Rajasekhara Reddy's death.

Production
By early January 2018, the producers Vijay Chilla and Shashi Devireddy under their banner 70MM Entertainments had registered the title Yatra, while director Mahi V. Raghav was at the final phase of scripting.

Casting
Director Mahi V. Raghav said Mammootty was the first choice to play the role of Y. S. Rajasekhara Reddy, but it took nearly five months to bring him on board. Mammootty's performance in the 1991 film Thalapathi inspired director Mahi V Raghav to cast him in the film. In April 2018, Posani Krishna Murali was chosen to play YSR's personal assistant Sureedu.
In May, Hindi actor Sachin Khedekar was selected to play former Chief Minister of Andhra Pradesh N. Bhaskara Rao, while Rao Ramesh was chosen to play K. V. P. Ramachandra Rao, a close associate of Reddy. In June, Suhasini Maniratnam was cast to portray Sabitha Indra Reddy, a sister figure to Reddy and the first woman Home Minister in Andhra Pradesh, while television actress Anasuya Bharadwaj was reported to play a politician from Kurnool district. In July, Jagapathi Babu was selected to feature Y. S. Raja Reddy, YSR's father.

Release and reception 
The film was released on 8 February 2019.

Critical response 
Hemanth Kumar of Firstpost gave 3 out of 5 stars stating "Yatra feels like just its title. The route is long and you are moved to tears at times, but without any major twists or turns that leave you in awe of the whole journey". Manoj Kumar R of The Indian Express gave 3 out of 5 stars stating "Beyond politics, Mahi V Raghav film Yatra, starring Mammootty, also works as a decent human drama.". Karthik Kumar of Hindustan Times gave 3 out of 5 stars stating "Mammootty’s docudrama is at its best when it focuses on the padayatra, devoid of any major twists and turns that usually leave you in awe". Sify gave 3 out of 5 stars stating "Political movies work more if you have a similar political bent". Venkat Arikatla of Great Andhra gave 3 out of 5 stars stating "More than politics, the emotional sequences work out well for all".

Box office
Yatra collected  in the first five days. The film, which grossed a total of  28.5 crore worldwide against a budget of 12 crore, performed decently at the box office. Its worldwide distributor's share was  15.8 crore. Yatra Managed to collect ₹ 1.20 crore at the USA Box Office.

References

External links 
 

2010s Telugu-language films
Indian biographical drama films
2019 biographical drama films
Films scored by K (composer)
2019 drama films
2019 films
70mm Entertainments films
Films directed by Mahi V Raghav